The following is a list of New Zealand Tertiary (University and Polytechnic) Students' Associations:

Tertiary Student Associations 
 Auckland University of Technology: AuSM
 Massey University: 
 ASA (Albany Students' Association (Auckland))
 MAWSA (Massey At Wellington Students' Association (Wellington))
 M@D (Massey @ Distance (Extramural))
 MUSA (Massey University Students' Association (Palmerston North))
 Victoria University of Wellington: 
VUWSA (Victoria University of Wellington Students' Association)
Victoria Postgraduate Students' Association (PGSA)
 UCOL (Universal College of Learning) : AS@U (Association of Students at UCOL)
 University of Waikato : WSU (Waikato Students' Union)
 Waikato Institute of Technology (WINTEC) : SAWIT (Students' Association of Waikato Institute of Technology) 
 University of Auckland :
AUSA (Auckland University Students' Association)
The University of Auckland Postgraduate Students' Association (PGSA)
 University of Canterbury : UCSA (University of Canterbury Students' Association)
 Lincoln University: LUSA (Lincoln University Students' Association)
 University of Otago : OUSA (Otago University Students' Association)
 Otago Polytechnic : OPSA (Otago Polytechnic Students' Association)
 Christchurch Polytechnic : CPSA (Christchurch Polytechnic Students' Association)
 BOP Polytechnic Bay of Plenty Polytechnic Students Association (BOPPSA)
 SANITI - Student Association of the Nelson Marlborough Institute of Technology Inc
 Students' Association at Unitec New Zealand, Auckland, New Zealand
 Tai Poutini Polytechnic Students' Association
 Wellington Institute of Technology (WelTec) and Whitireia New Zealand:  Student Connection
 WITSA - Waiariki Institute of Technology Student Association
 International Pacific College Students Association (IPCSA)

Māori Student Associations 
(all work in parallel to mainstream associations):
 New Zealand Union of Students' Associations: Te Mana Akonga
 Auckland University of Technology: Titahi ki Tua
 Massey University: 
 Manawatahi (Palmerston North)
 Te Waka o Ngā Ākonga Māori (Auckland)
 Kokiri Ngātahi (Wellington)
 Victoria University of Wellington : Ngai Tauira
 University of Auckland: Ngā Tauira Māori
 University of Canterbury: Te Akatoki
 Lincoln University: Te Awhioraki
 University of Otago: Te Roopū Māori

Pacific Student Associations 
All Pacific student associations work in parallel to mainstream associations:
 New Zealand Union of Students' Associations: Tauira Pasifika
 Auckland Institute of Studies: Maori Pacific Island Students Association (MPI)
 Auckland University of Technology: Auckland University of Technology Pacific Islands Students' Association (Fale Niu)
 University of Auckland: Auckland University Pacific Islands Students' Association (AUPISA)
 University of Otago: University of Otago Pacific Islands Students' Association (UOPISA)

Nationwide student bodies 
 New Zealand Union of Students' Associations (NZUSA, formerly New Zealand University Students' Association)
 Te Mana Ākonga, National Māori Students' Association (parallel partnership with NZUSA)
 Tauira Pasifika, National Pasifika Students' Association (parallel partnership with NZUSA)
 New Zealand Tongan Tertiary Students' Association NZTTSA (MoU with NZUSA)
 Aotearoa Student Press Association
 Every Nation Campus Ministries (ENCM)
 Student Life New Zealand (Christian students' association)
 Tertiary Students Christian Fellowship
 UniQ (association of gay, lesbian, bisexual, transgender, transsexual, takataapui and intersex students)
 University Sport New Zealand
 New Zealand Law Students' Association (NZLSA)
 Student Job Search (SJS)
 New Zealand Medical Students' Association (NZMSA)
 New Zealand International Students' Association (NZISA)

See also

 Tertiary education in New Zealand

References

 
Students